Bontempi is an Italian musical instrument manufacturer, best known for manufacturing low-priced, plastic-cased chord organs: small keyboard instruments in which the sound is produced by air being forced over reeds by an electric fan.

Such instruments were popular in the 1970s and early 1980s, and continued to be made until the mid-1980s, when Bontempi moved to manufacturing small, home electronic keyboards. The company continues to make low-priced musical instruments aimed at the educational and toy market, including keyboards, guitars, drum kits and various items of tuned percussion.

Bontempi has been manufacturing musical instruments and toys for over 80 years; some of its fan-blown reed organs were built by Comus S.p.A.

Some European musicians use the expression "having a Bontempi sound" to describe an electronic instrument that sounds like a young child's toy, as they were children when Bontempi instruments were extremely popular in western  Europe.

See also

 List of Italian companies

References

Musical instrument manufacturing companies of Italy
Electronic organ manufacturing companies
Companies based in le Marche
Electronics companies of Italy
Manufacturing companies established in 1937
Italian companies established in 1937
Italian brands